In Indonesia, Suara Katolik is the official newspaper of the Catholic Party. It began to be published on 1924, as the mouthpiece of the Javan Catholic Political Union (PPKD). The newspaper focused on social affairs.

The newspaper ceased to be published following the occupation of the Japanese.  The newspaper began to be published again since 1 January 1950, a years after the establishment of the Catholic Party. The newspaper was organized by the Central Executive Council of the Catholic Party.

Bibliography

References 

1924 establishments in the Dutch East Indies
Defunct newspapers published in Indonesia
Mass media in Jakarta
Publications disestablished in 1942
Newspapers published in the Dutch East Indies